Thioinosinic acid (or thioinosine monophosphate, TIMP) is an intermediate metabolite of azathioprine, an immunosuppressive drug.

References

Nucleotides
Purines